Kabarore is a town in Rwanda. It is the headquarters of Gatsibo District.

Location
The coordinates of the town are:1° 37' 15.60"S, 30° 23' 6.00"E (Latitude:-1.6210; Longitude:30.3850).

Population
The exact population of Kabarore is 50,288.

Points of interest
The points of interest within the town limits or close to the edges of town include:

 The headquarters of Gatsibo District
 Offices of Kabarore Town Council
 Kabarore Central Market
 Kabarore Health Center
 A branch of the Bank of Kigali

External links
Location of Kabarore At Google Maps

See also
 Gatsibo District
 Eastern Province, Rwanda
 Bank of Kigali
 Akagera National Park

References

Gatsibo District
Eastern Province, Rwanda
Populated places in Rwanda